Sweden competed at the 2014 Winter Paralympics in Sochi, Russia from the 7–16 March 2014.

Medalists

Alpine skiing 

Women

Biathlon 

Men

Cross-country skiing

Men's distance

Women's distance

Relay

Sprint

Ice sledge hockey

Team: Ulf Nilsson, Kenth Jonsson, Niklas Ingvarsson, Rasmus Lundgren, Marcus Holm, Christian Hedberg, Per Kasperi, Peter Ojala, Niklas Rakos, Stefan Olsson, Gunnar From

5–8 Classification Play-offs

7th Place Game

Wheelchair curling

Team: Jalle Jungnell, Glenn Ikonen, Patrik Kallin, Kristina Ullander, Zandra Reppe

Round Robin

Draw 1

Draw 2

Draw 3

Draw 4

Draw 5

Draw 6

Draw 7

Draw 8

Draw 9

See also
 Sweden at the 2014 Winter Olympics

References

External links
 Media guide

Nations at the 2014 Winter Paralympics
2014
2014 in Swedish sport